Aspak may refer to:
 Asbak, Qazvin Province, Iran
 Asfak, South Khorasan Province, Iran
 Esfahak, South Khorasan Province, Iran